Richard Lowell Roudebush (January 18, 1918 – January 28, 1995) was an American World War II veteran who served five terms as a U.S. Representative from Indiana from 1961 to 1971.

Early life and education 
Born on a farm in Hamilton County, near Noblesville, Indiana, Roudebush attended Hamilton County schools. He graduated from Butler University, Indianapolis, in 1941.

World War II 
He served in the United States Army from November 18, 1941, to August 12, 1944, as a demolition specialist for the Ordnance Department in Middle Eastern, North African, and Italian campaigns. He was a farmer and a partner in a livestock commission company. He served as National Commander of the Veterans of Foreign Wars in 1957–1958, and as chairman of the Indiana Veterans Commission from 1954 to 1960.

Congress
Roudebush was elected as a Republican to the Eighty-seventh and to the four succeeding Congresses (January 3, 1961 – January 3, 1971). He was not a candidate in 1970 for reelection, but was an unsuccessful candidate for election to the United States Senate against incumbent Democrat Vance Hartke in the closest Senate election in Indiana history.

Later career and death 
He later served as the Administrator of Veterans Affairs, Veterans Administration from 1974 to 1977.

He died on January 28, 1995.  The Richard L. Roudebush V.A. Medical Center in Indianapolis was named in his honor.

See also

 List of members of the House Un-American Activities Committee

References

External links
 

|-

|-

|-

|-

1918 births
1995 deaths
20th-century American politicians
United States Army personnel of World War II
Butler University alumni
Burials at Arlington National Cemetery
Military personnel from Indiana
People from Hamilton County, Indiana
United States Department of Veterans Affairs officials
National Commanders of the Veterans of Foreign Wars
Republican Party members of the United States House of Representatives from Indiana